The Mercedes-Benz CLS (initially called the CLS-Class) is a series of executive cars produced by Mercedes-Benz since 2004.

The original model was a four-door sedan based on the Mercedes E-Class platform, marketed as a four door coupé. An estate (Shooting Brake) model was later added to the model range with the second generation CLS. All models are available as a high performance AMG variant, although it wasn't until the second generation CLS that 4MATIC all-wheel drive was offered.

The CLS range is positioned between the E-Class and the S-Class within the Mercedes model range, and models tend to be less practical than the E-Class it is based on. It primarily competes with other fastback sedans like the BMW 8 Series Gran Coupe, Porsche Panamera and Audi A7.

First generation (C219; 2004)

Marketed from Mercedes as a four-door coupé, the CLS was designed by Michael Fink in 2001 who also styled the first generation CLK, the C-SportCoupé, and Maybach 57 and 62. In Europe the model name is C219 while in US the CLS is more commonly named. IVM Automotive, a subsidiary of German roof system specialist Edscha, developed the entire vehicle from the Vision CLS concept on which the CLS is based, to the production version which debuted at the 2004 New York International Auto Show.

Second generation (C218; 2010)

The C218 CLS is the second generation model, and was sold from 2011 to 2018. The body styles of the range are a 4-door coupé (C218 model code for Europe/ W218 for US market), and a 5-door estate (X218 model code, marketed as Shooting Brake). The design of the CLS was based on the Mercedes F800 concept and featured design cues from other models including the Mercedes SLS AMG. Unlike its predecessor, the C218 CLS is available with all-wheel drive and can be optionally configured on CLS 63 AMG models as well. In 2014, the CLS underwent a facelift and featured design changes, engine enhancements, and the adoption of the Mercedes 9G-Tronic automatic transmission.

Third generation (C257; 2018)

The C257 CLS is the third model and was previously available only as a four-door sedan and in rear-wheel or all-wheel drive (4MATIC) configuration. The Shooting Brake body style was in development for the C257 CLS, but was shortly discontinued due to poor and declining demand overseas for the last generation model. The range of engines consist of a 2.9-litre straight six turbocharged diesel engine and a 3.0-litre straight six turbocharged petrol engine. The latter equips the CLS 53 AMG with features such as a mild hybrid system and an Panamericana radiator grille, which pays tribute to 300 SL model. The CLS is also now a five-seater car, instead of being a four-seater as with the previous two generations.

Sales

References

Bibliography

External links

 Official site

CLS
Cars introduced in 2004
2010s cars
2020s cars
Executive cars
Sedans
Station wagons
Rear-wheel-drive vehicles
All-wheel-drive vehicles
Cars of Germany